Michelle Zaffino is an American author of young adult fiction and memoir, founder of the book discovery product MyLibrarian, an information architect, digital librarian, and content consultant based in San Francisco.

Early life and education
Zaffino grew up in Warren, Pennsylvania. She graduated from the University of Pittsburgh with a B.A. in English Writing (Magazine concentration), and Women’s Studies. While at Pitt, Zaffino was a member of the Kappa Kappa Gamma women's fraternity. She continued her studies at the University of Pittsburgh and later completed the master's program in Library and Information Science with a concentration in Digital Libraries, Information Architecture, Management and Reference, in 2012.

Career 
Zaffino moved to New York City to pursue a career in magazine writing and editing. During her time there she worked as a writer, editor and researcher at Hearst Corporation for publications such as Marie Claire, Redbook, Elle, Sports Afield and Esquire. While managing the research department of Marie Claire, she wrote Does Your Guy Need A Makeover?, which inspired TV’s Queer Eye for the Straight Guy. Zaffino also worked in New York as the office assistant to literary photojournalist Jill Krementz. Her work has been published in Marie Claire, Redbook, Sports Afield, SEEN, Double Negative, IndiePlanet, Mr. Beller’s Neighborhood, The Bold Italic. and is featured in Takemywordforit.net, an organization dedicated to igniting kid's passions for writing.

She recently completed her first teen novel, How Good it Can Be, and a sequel, The Love Quad, both Saffron Stories novels. How Good It Can Be appeared on the syllabus for freshman English Composition at the Tarleton State University part of the Texas A&M University System in Spring 2016. Her forthcoming historical young adult novel, Allegra, is based on the discovery of the satirical Pasquino statue in Rome, inspired by her paternal grandmother's name. Zaffino also recently completed MyMultimedia Memoir, chronicling the journey of her first novel to publication. She received the Savvy Life Blogger Award in 2014. She's currently serializing the interactive mystery Skylar Saffron, Librarian Detective online.

Zaffino is the Founder, CEO and Chief Digital Librarian of In the Stacks.tv, a web portal that aggregates book content produced by librarians. MyLibrarian uses expertly curated, data-driven technology to provide users with a reference desk experience online. MyLibrarian/In the Stacks products provide book recommendations based on ranked librarian book reviews via an expert database, called the Librarian Brain.  Founded in 2008, In the Stacks is the first online video book review program hosted by a librarian, and the associated eBook publishing company, In the Stacks Publishing, participates in Litquake Lit Crawl in San Francisco, where Librarian Authors In the Stacks read from their recent work. In the Stacks is startup-in-residence at the San Francisco Mechanics' Institute, and demonstrated the book discovery app there in March 2016. Incorporating as MyLibrarian in 2018, the product, which aims to ensure diversity and inclusion in book publishing artificial intelligence, raised funding to release version 4.0 in Fall 2019.

Works 
The Saffron Stories Novels:
 How Good It Can Be (2014)
 The Love Quad (2015)
 Skylar Saffron, Librarian Detective (2016-2019)

References

External links

 http://www.michellezaffino.com 
 http://www.inthestacks.tv
 http://howgooditcanbe.com/?page_id=27
 http://www.michellezaffino.com/?p=17

American librarians
American women librarians
Writers from Pennsylvania
University of Pittsburgh alumni
Living people
21st-century American writers
21st-century American women writers
Writers from San Francisco
People from Warren, Pennsylvania
Year of birth missing (living people)